Charley Pride's 10th Album is the eighth studio album by the American country music artist of the same name. It was released in 1970 on the RCA Victor label (catalog no. LSP-4367).

The album was awarded four stars from the web site AllMusic. It debuted on Billboard magazine's country album chart on July 25, 1970, peaked at No. 1, and remained on the chart for 49 weeks. The album also included the No. 1 hit single "Is Anybody Goin' to San Antone".

Track listing

Charts

Weekly charts

Year-end charts

See also
 Charley Pride discography

References

1970 albums
Charley Pride albums
albums produced by Jack Clement
RCA Records albums